"Something Good Can Work" is the first single by the Northern Irish rock band Two Door Cinema Club. The single was first released for promotion, but was released again on 7 April 2009 after signing with Kitsuné Music. The music video, which was filmed in Gran Canaria (Canary Islands), has amassed over fourteen million views on YouTube.

"Something Good Can Work" appeared as the first track on Kitsuné's compilation Kitsuné Maison Compilation 7. The version on this compilation is different from the final album version, featuring slightly different vocals and a more guitar-oriented sound. There is also a different music video for this version.

Both "Something Good Can Work" and "Do You Want It All?" appear on Two Door Cinema Club's album Tourist History.

Usage in media
An instrumental version of the song was used in episodes of the popular British sitcom The Inbetweeners. The song was also used in the 2011 film Chalet Girl, in the pilot of Covert Affairs, in one episode of MTV series I Used to Be Fat.

The Twelves Remix version of "Something Good Can Work" was featured in the 2012 video games SSX and Forza Horizon.

Track listing

Chart performance

References

External links

Kitsuné singles
2009 debut singles
Two Door Cinema Club songs
2009 songs